The Shevchenkivskyi District is an urban district of the city of Kyiv, the capital of Ukraine. It was originally established on 4 April 1937, although in 2001 its area was increased following an annexation of the former Radianskyi and StaroKyivskyi districts.

The district is historically significant, as it was here on the Old Kyiv mount where the apostle Saint Andrew erected the cross, also the famous Golden Gate of Kyiv, the main entrance to the medieval city of Kyiv is located in the district, as are the three major churches of the city: Saint Sophia, Saint Michael and Saint Andrew. Furthermore, in this district the first parliament of Ukraine met at the Ukrainian Club Building and declared Independence in 1917.

Attractions 
The district also has the local opera house and several universities, such as Taras Shevchenko National University of Kyiv and Kyiv National Economic University. It also houses the National Academy of Sciences of Ukraine on the Volodymyrska Street. Kyiv Zoo, local zoo, is also located here. The other no less important landmarks of the district are historical monuments such as churches and cathedrals: Sophiivs'kyi Cathedral, Volodymyrs'kyi Cathedral, Mykhaylivs’kyi Zolotoverkhyi Monastery, and others. Also place where the Orange Revolution took place, Maydan Nezalezhnosti is in the district and is adjacent to Khreshchatyk street. Other attractions located in the district are Peremohy Square, Besarabskyi Market, Babyn Yar and Kyiv TV Tower.

Location 
Main streets are: Khreshchatyk street, Volodymyrska Street, Prospect Beresteiskyi (Shevchenko Boulevard), Dehtiarivska Street, Olena Teliha Street, Melnykov Street, and others. The district borders with Podil to the north; Pecherskyi District, Holosiivskyi District, and Solomianskyi District to the south; and Sviatoshynskyi District to the west.

In June 2008 the Kyiv City Council renamed Kominterna Street (located in this district) to Symon Petliura Street to commemorate the occasion of his 130th birthday anniversary.

In February 2023 Prospect Peremohy was renamed to Prospect Beresteiska by the Kyiv City Council.

Neighborhoods
 Old Kyiv
 Kudryavets
 Soldatska slobidka
 Tatarka
 Lukyanivska
 Shuliavska
 Syrets
 Nyvky

Shuliavska (Shuliavka) includes Pushkin Park and Kyiv Zoo to the north, south of which is the Kyiv Polytechnic, while the Kosmopolit Mall (Cosmo Multimall) and the Shuliavska Metro station lie at its western end. To its northwest lies Nyvky, and Syrets to its north and Lukyanivska in the north-east. It is traversed by Prospect Beresteiska one of the major arterial roads of Kyiv.

References

External links 
 shev.gov.ua – Shevchenkivskyi District administration website 

Urban districts of Kyiv